Piedmont azalea is a common name for several plants and may refer to:

Rhododendron canescens, with pink to white flowers
Rhododendron flammeum, with red to orange flowers